Alaska’s state park system is managed by the Alaska Department of Natural Resources division of Parks and Outdoor Recreation. The system contains over 120 units spanning 3,427,895 acres, making it far larger than any other state park system in the United States. The State Park system began in 1970 with the creation of Denali State Park, Chugach State Park and Kachemak Bay State Park, three of the largest and still most popular parks in the state system. Wood-Tikchik State Park is the largest state park in the United States, comprising some 15% of total state park land in the nation. The division manages full state parks, state recreation areas, state recreation sites, and state historic sites.

Anchorage area park 
 Chugach State Park

Copper River Basin area parks 

 Dry Creek State Recreation Site
 Lake Louise State Recreation Area
 Liberty Falls State Recreation Site
 Porcupine Creek State Recreation Site
 Squirrel Creek State Recreation Site

Interior Alaska parks 
 Fairbanks area
 Birch Lake State Recreation Site

 Chena River State Recreation Area
 Chena River State Recreation Site
 Harding Lake State Recreation Area
 Lower Chatanika River State Recreation Area
 Salcha River State Recreation Site
 Upper Chatanika River State Recreation Site
 Delta Junction area
 Big Delta State Historical Park
 Clearwater State Recreation Site
 Delta State Recreation Site
 Donnelly Creek State Recreation Site
 Fielding Lake State Recreation Site
 Quartz Lake State Recreation Area

 Tok area
 Eagle Trail State Recreation Site
 Moon Lake State Recreation Site
 Tok River State Recreation Site

Kenai Peninsula area parks 
 Homer area
 Anchor River State Recreation Area
 Deep Creek State Recreation Area
 Diamond Creek State Recreation Area
 Stariski State Recreation Site

 Kachemak Bay State Park
 Kachemak Bay State Wilderness Park
 Ninilchik State Recreation Area
 Kenai/Soldotna area
 Captain Cook State Recreation Area
 
 Clam Gulch State Recreation Area
 Crooked Creek State Recreation Site
 Johnson Lake State Recreation Area
 Kasilof River State Recreation Site
 Kenai River Special Management Area
 Morgan’s Landing State Recreation Area
 Scout Lake State Recreation Site
 Seward area
 Caines Head State Recreation Area
 Driftwood Bay State Marine Park
 Lowell Point State Recreation Site
 Safety Cove State Marine Park
 Sandspit Point State Marine Park
 Sunny Cove State Marine Park
 Thumb Cove State Marine Park

Kodiak Island area parks 
 Afognak Island State Park
 Buskin River State Recreation Site
 Fort Abercrombie State Historical Park
 Pasagshak River State Recreation Site
 Shuyak Island State Park
 Woody Island State Recreation Site

Matanuska-Susitna Valley area parks 

 Big Lake North State Recreation Area
 Big Lake South State Recreation Site
 Blair Lake State Recreation Site
 Denali State Park

 Lake Louise State Recreation Area
 Nancy Lake State Recreation Area
 Nancy Lake State Recreation Site
 Finger Lake State Recreation Area
 Hatcher Pass East Special Management Area
 Independence Mine State Historical Park
 Kepler-Bradley Lakes State Recreation Area
 King Mountain State Recreation Site

 Matanuska Glacier State Recreation Site
 Montana Creek State Recreation Site
 Rocky Lake State Recreation Site
 Summit Lake State Recreation Site
 Tokositna River State Recreation Site
 Willow Creek State Recreation Area

Prince William Sound area parks 
 Bettles Bay State Marine Park

 Blueberry Lake State Recreation Site
 Boswell Bay Beaches State Marine Park
 Canoe Passage State Marine Park
 Decision Point State Marine Park
 Entry Cove State Marine Park
 Granite Bay State Marine Park
 Horseshoe Bay State Marine Park
 Jack Bay State Marine Park
 Kayak Island State Marine Park
 Sawmill Bay State Marine Park
 Shoup Bay State Marine Park
 South Esther Island State Marine Park
 Surprise Cove State Marine Park
 Surprise Ridge State Marine Park

 Worthington Glacier State Recreation Site
 Ziegler Cove State Marine Park

Southeast Alaska parks 
 Haines/Skagway area
 Alaska Chilkat Bald Eagle Preserve
 Chilkat Islands State Marine Park
 Chilkat State Park
 Chilkoot Lake State Recreation Site
 Mosquito Lake State Recreation Site
 Portage Cove State Recreation Site
 Sullivan Island State Marine Park
 Juneau area
 Eagle Beach State Recreation Area
 Ernest Gruening State Historical Park
 Funter Bay State Marine Park
 Juneau Trail System
 Oliver Inlet State Marine Park
 Point Bridget State Park 
 Shelter Island State Marine Park
 St. James Bay State Marine Park
 Taku Harbor State Marine Park
 Wickersham State Historic Site
 Ketchikan area
 Black Sands Beach State Marine Park
 Dall Bay State Marine Park
 Grindall Island State Marine Park
 Refuge Cove State Recreation Site
 Settlers Cove State Recreation Site
 Totem Bight State Historical Park
 Sitka area
 Baranof Castle Hill State Historic Site
 Big Bear/Baby Bear State Marine Park
 Halibut Point State Recreation Site
 Magoun Islands State Marine Park
 Old Sitka State Historical Park
 Sealion Cove State Marine Park
 Security Bay State Marine Park
 Wrangell/Petersburg area
 Beecher Pass State Marine Park
 Joe Mace Island State Marine Park
 Petroglyph Beach State Historic Site
 Thoms Place State Marine Park

Southwest Alaska parks 
 Lake Aleknagik State Recreation Site
 Wood-Tikchik State Park

External links 
 Alaska Department of Natural Resources - Division of Parks and Outdoor Recreation

References

 
State parks
Alaska state parks